Norddeich station was a wireless radio station built in 1905 in Norddeich, Germany.

Background

The station was originally going to set up on the Island of Borkum but in the end Norddeich was chosen.

The station could convey messages throughout Europe as far as Russia, UK, part of Spain and most of Sweden and Norway. German vessels returning from North America could communicate with Germany from far out in the Atlantic once they passed 12 degrees west of Greenwich.

In 1910, it began to broadcast a time signal along with the broadcast tower on the Eiffel Tower.

During World War I it was used to signal German naval vessels. In 1925, three of its masts collapsed.

References

History of telecommunications in Germany
Military radio systems
Time signal radio stations
Towers completed in 1935